The Wuzhishan pig is a breed of inbred miniature pig created by Professor Feng Shutang to be used as a model animal for medical research.

Physical description 
The Wuzhishan pig grows up to a size of 50–70 cm (19.7-27.5 inches) long, and up to 30-35 kilograms (66.1-77.2 pounds) in weight.

They have a black head and back, and pink legs and bellies.

Additionally, the Wuzhishan pig is often used to study the cardiovascular system in humans, due to the similarity of the pig's organs to those of a human.

Genetic research 
The full genome sequence and analysis was completed by BGI Group in 2012; the breed was successfully identified in early 2013. The intellectual property rights for the breed are protected by both Chinese and American patents.

On May 18, 2015, the Chinese Academy of Agricultural Sciences announced that its Institute of Animal Science had agreed to transfer all breeding research to Beijing Grand Life Science & Technology Co., Ltd., which has the sole rights to breed and sell Wuzhishan pigs for commercial purposes. On November 19, 2016, the company successfully produced a litter of eight inbred piglets of F25 (the 25th generation), with an inbreeding coefficient of 0.995.

Over 12 leading Chinese research institutions, medical schools, hospitals, and enterprises have conducted or are conducting research into the Wuzhishan pigs with an aim to establish their suitability as research models. Additional research on the future life science and medical applications of the pigs has begun, and the initial results include the injection of embryonic germ cells into blastocysts, as well as islet isolation and purification.

On June 23, 2017, the Academy of Military Medical Sciences and Grand Life Science jointly announced that the PERV-pol gene-deficient WZSP have been identified and verified by systematic virology methods and whole genome sequencing. Grand Life has succeed in reproducing F0/F1 PERV-noninfectious WZSP pigs that available for advanced biomedical research purposes, including a series of studies under the 2017-2020 National Primary Research Programs on bio-material development, tissue-organ repair.

See also 

 Inbreeding
 Animal testing

References

Pig breeds originating in China
Pig breeds
Inbred animals